Richard Wagner (October 19, 1927 – October 5, 2006) was a sports, entertainment, and broadcasting executive who spent twenty-five years in Major League Baseball. He was best known for running the Cincinnati Reds during the 1970s and the Houston Astros during the 1980s.

Early life and careers
Born in Central City, Nebraska, Wagner's career in professional baseball began at a young age. In 1947, only 19 and fresh out of the Navy, he took a position as business manager of a Class D Georgia–Florida League team, a Detroit Tigers affiliate. In a prosperous era for the minor leagues, Wagner steadily worked his way up through leagues and classifications, shifting at one point to the Pittsburgh Pirates chain and working there under the tutelage of Branch Rickey. He held minor league administrative posts in Flint, Michigan; Miami, Florida; San Antonio, Texas; Hutchinson, Kansas; and Lincoln, Nebraska. At Lincoln, in 1958, he was named Top Minor League Executive of the Year by the Sporting News.

Shifting career tracks in 1959, Wagner took a position as General Manager of Pershing Auditorium in Lincoln, Nebraska. In the next decade, he held posts in entertainment and broadcasting. He was an executive for Ice Capades in Hollywood, California. In Salina, Kansas, Wagner ran radio station KSAL. He also served as General Manager of  The Forum in Inglewood, California, home of the Los Angeles Lakers and Kings. From the Forum, he returned to major league baseball, where he spent the remaining balance of his working years.

Years with the Reds and the Astros
After several years as Director of Promotions with the St. Louis Cardinals under Bob Howsam, Wagner followed Howsam to the Cincinnati Reds in 1967. He spent the next fifteen years in the front office during that team's successful run as "The Big Red Machine", beginning by supervising business affairs for the Reds, helping to pioneer, develop and refine marketing and promotional efforts that resulted in a series of attendance records. Later, he added duties on the player personnel side and in 1978 was made President and General Manager of the team. During the years Wagner was part of the organization, the Reds won consecutive World Series titles in 1975 and 1976, in addition to four league flags and six division titles. During his Cincinnati years, he resided in Glendale, Ohio, a greater Cincinnati suburb.  He continued as President and General Manager until he was fired by the Reds on July 11, 1983. By that time "Robert T. Wag" had dismantled the Big Red Machine by, among other things, allowing Pete Rose to leave as a free agent to the Phillies.

Wagner innovated the practice of Major League teams wearing green-trimmed uniforms on March 17 in honor of St. Patrick's Day. Wagner was the general manager of the Reds, and had green versions of the Reds' uniforms made. The Reds hosted the New York Yankees at Al Lopez Field on March 17, 1978. This was the first time a major league team wore green trimmed uniforms on March 17, a practice adopted in subsequent years by multiple major league teams on St. Patrick's Day.

Wagner was named general manager of the Houston Astros in September of 1985 and continued the solidification of the already successful Houston team. His Astros won the 1986 National League West championship, clinching the division with a September 25 no-hitter by team pitching ace Mike Scott. Wagner resigned as general manager in 1987, following a power struggle with team manager Hal Lanier.

Later years
In 1988, MLB Commissioner Peter Ueberroth and American League President Bobby Brown named Wagner a Special Assistant. Throughout the next decade, he served Brown and a succession of Commissioners as a top-level aide.

Wagner retired to Phoenix, Arizona with his wife Gloria. There he served on the board of the Western Art Associates of the Phoenix Art Museum and as a vice-president of the Association of Professional Ball Players of America. Wagner was involved in a car accident in 1999 that resulted in trauma and injuries that required attention for the rest of his life. He died in Phoenix in 2006.

References

External links
 Former Reds President Wagner dies

1927 births
2006 deaths
People from Central City, Nebraska
Sportspeople from Nebraska
Cincinnati Reds executives
Houston Astros executives
Major League Baseball executives
Major League Baseball general managers
St. Louis Cardinals executives